Danny Ocean may refer to:

Danny Ocean (singer), Venezuelan singer, songwriter and record producer
Danny Ocean (character), a fictional character in Ocean's 11 and sequels